Mount Victoria is an unincorporated community in southern Charles County, Maryland, United States, between the Wicomico and Potomac Rivers. It was named for an enormous farm of  owned by Robert Crain, an attorney and farmer whose lobbying efforts led to the opening in 1927 of the Maryland portion of U.S. Highway 301.  This farm was said at the time to be the largest private landholding in Maryland.

References

Unincorporated communities in Charles County, Maryland
Unincorporated communities in Maryland